Taekwondo at the 2018 Asian Games was held at the Jakarta Convention Center Plenary Hall, Jakarta, Indonesia, from 19 to 23 August 2018.

Schedule

Medalists

Poomsae

Men's kyorugi

Women's kyorugi

Medal table

Participating nations
A total of 287 athletes from 35 nations competed in taekwondo at the 2018 Asian Games:

References

External links
Taekwondo at the 2018 Asian Games
Official Result Book – Taekwondo

 
2018 Asian Games events
Asian Games
2018